Louis Monast (July 1, 1863April 16, 1936) was a U.S. Representative from Rhode Island.

Monast was born in Marieville in the Province of Canada (now Quebec). In the spring of 1865, he immigrated to the United States with his father, who settled in Pawtucket, Rhode Island.
He attended parochial and night schools.
He was employed in the textile mills from 1872 to 1882 and as a bricklayer, plasterer, and carpenter from 1882 to 1892.
He engaged in building construction and in the real estate business in 1892, and also operated several bakeries.
He served as member of the State house of representatives 1909–1911.
He served as delegate to the Republican National Convention in 1924.
He was an unsuccessful candidate for election in 1924 to the Sixty-ninth Congress.

Monast was elected as a Republican to the Seventieth Congress (March 4, 1927 – March 3, 1929).
He was an unsuccessful candidate for reelection in 1928 to the Seventy-first Congress.
He resumed the real estate business.
He died in Pawtucket, Rhode Island, April 16, 1936.
He was interred in Notre Dame Cemetery.

Sources

1863 births
1936 deaths
American bricklayers
American carpenters
American real estate businesspeople
Politicians from Pawtucket, Rhode Island
Republican Party members of the Rhode Island House of Representatives
Republican Party members of the United States House of Representatives from Rhode Island
Pre-Confederation Canadian emigrants to the United States